Child with Toy Hand Grenade in Central Park, N.Y.C. 1962 (1962) is a famous black and white photograph by Diane Arbus.

Significance
The photograph Child with Toy Hand Grenade in Central Park, N.Y.C. 1962, by Diane Arbus, shows a boy, with the left strap of his shorts hanging off his shoulder, tensely holding his long, stringy, thin arms by his side.  Clenched in his right hand is a toy replica hand grenade (an Mk 2 "Pineapple"), his left hand is held in a claw-like gesture, and his facial expression is maniacal.

The contact sheet is "revealing with regards to Arbus' working method. She engages with the boy while moving around him, saying she was trying to find the right angle. The sequence of shots she took depicts a really quite ordinary boy who just shows off for the camera. However, the published single image belies this by concentrating on a freakish posture - an editorial choice typical for Arbus who would invariably pick the most expressive image, thereby frequently suggesting an extreme situation." The boy in the photograph is Colin Wood, son of tennis player Sidney Wood. An interview with Colin, with his recollections about the photograph, is presented in the BBC documentary The Genius of Photography.

According to The Washington Post, Colin does not specifically remember Arbus taking the photo, but that he was likely "imitating a face I'd seen in war movies, which I loved watching at the time." Later, as a teenager, he was angry at Arbus for "making fun of a skinny kid with a sailor suit", though he enjoys the photograph now.

History
The photograph was displayed at the Museum of Modern Art in 1967 under the title Exasperated Boy with Toy Hand Grenade in the New Documents exhibition, a three-person show featuring works by Arbus, Lee Friedlander, and Garry Winogrand.

It was published in the 1970 Time-Life book, The Camera.

There are seven known original prints by Arbus of the photograph, one of which sold for $408,000 in April 2005 at Christie's in New York. Posthumous prints from the original negative have been made by Neil Selkirk, authorised by Arbus's estate.

Collections
Jointly held by Tate and National Galleries of Scotland, UK
Metropolitan Museum of Art, New York

See also

Identical Twins, Roselle, New Jersey, 1967

References

External links
"Diane Arbus: Child with Toy Hand Grenade". In Timeline of Art History: The Metropolitan Museum of Art
"Photography post 1960: Diane Arbus' Boy with a Toy Hand Grenade", Smarthistory video.
"Who has the detonator?" Blog post about Child with Toy Hand Grenade.

1962 works
1962 in art
Black-and-white photographs
Photographs of the United States
Central Park
Collections of the National Galleries of Scotland
1960s photographs